Coffs Harbour is an electoral district of the Legislative Assembly in the Australian state of New South Wales. Since 2019 it has been represented by Gurmesh Singh of the National Party.

The district takes in the entirety of the City of Coffs Harbour and includes the localities of Coffs Harbour, Sawtell, Coramba, Korora Bay, Moonee Beach, Emerald Beach, Woolgoolga, Arrawarra, Corindi Beach and Red Rock.

Members for Coffs Harbour

Election results

References

Coffs Harbour
Coffs Harbour
Coffs Harbour
Coffs Harbour